Peter Lawrence John Aloysius Pender (23 July 1887 – 1 November 1966) was an  Australian rules footballer who played with Geelong in the Victorian Football League (VFL).

Notes

External links 

1887 births
1966 deaths
Australian rules footballers from Melbourne
Geelong Football Club players
People from Footscray, Victoria